The Battle of Cortenuova (sometimes spelled Cortenova) was fought on 27 November 1237 in the course of the Guelphs and Ghibellines Wars: in it, Holy Roman Emperor Frederick II defeated the Second Lombard League.

Background
In 1235 Emperor Frederick was in Germany to quell the rebellion of his son Henry. In the autumn of that year he decided to return to Italy to suppress the Lombard communes which, backed by Pope Gregory IX, were contesting his authority. He arrived at Valeggio, near Verona, and, with the help of Ezzelino III da Romano and other Ghibelline leaders, sacked the city of Vicenza. Satisfied with this first outcome, he came back to Germany to deal with another German princes' rebellion, leaving Hermann von Salza, Grand Master of the Teutonic Order, in Italy to monitor the situation.

In August 1237 the emperor returned again to Italy, this time aiming to definitively crush the Second Lombard League. He crossed the Alps to Verona and here his 2,000 knights were joined by Ezzelino III da Romano's troops, including soldiers from Treviso, Padua, Vicenza, and Verona itself, as well as by Tuscan men led by Gaboard of Arnstein. Later 6,000 infantry and horsemen from the Kingdom of Sicily came, including Apulian Muslim archers. The rest of the army was formed by Ghibellines from Cremona, Pavia, Modena, Parma, and Reggio, for a total of 12,000 – 15,000 men

The imperial army marched first against Mantua, which decided to surrender instead of being sacked, and then to Bergamo, whose council of nobles took the same decision in exchange for no formal submission. Frederick then invaded Brescia's territory, capturing Goito and Montichiari among the others, although the latter's resistance gave time for most of the Lombard League troops to reach Brescia. The 2,000-knights and 6,000-infantry strong army, led by Pietro Tiepolo, podestà of Milan and son of the doge of Venice, occupied a favorable position at Manerbio (November 1237). The two armies remained fifteen days facing each other without battling, separated by a marsh that thwarted the knights' effectiveness. Frederick, whose army was becoming short of supply, left his camp in search of a more advantageous position, and on 24 November 1237 crossed the Oglio River, marching northwards to wait for the enemy's moves at Soncino.

The battle
The Lombards believed the rumors, skilfully spread by the emperor, that he was withdrawing to Cremona to spend the winter there. Therefore, they also started towards their winter quarters. However, Frederick had posted a contingent from Bergamo at Cividate al Piano, which would inform him of the Lombard movements through smoke signals. When the Lombard army had completed its crossing of Oglio at Pontoglio and Palazzolo, the imperial troops saw large clouds of smoke and moved to Cortenuova, which was 18 km from their current positions.

The imperial vanguard included Saracens and horsemen, which were the first units to attack the withdrawing Lombards, followed by the infantry. Taken by surprise, the Milanese and Piacentines were unable to form a defense line, and fled to Cortenuova. When Frederick and his main force reached the battlefield, it was scattered with knights, slain or wounded and his passage blocked by riderless horses. At Cortenuova, other Milanese and troops from Alessandria rallied around their Carroccio, where the Lombards fought valiantly under the Saracen arrows and the Teutonic charges. A column of men from Milanese noble families, despite the arrival of other Bergamo troops, was able to protect the rest of the army's retreat to Cortenuova till nightfall. To keep the army's morale as high as possible, Frederick ordered his troop to sleep with their armor on, and to attack at the first light of dawn. On the other side, the podestà of Milan, recognizing that the troops could not withstand another battle, ordered the  abandonment of the town along with the Carroccio and the rest of the baggage.

On the dawn of 28 November the Imperials attacked the hastily-retreating Lombards, who collapsed with minimal resistance. Many drowned in the Oglio, which was overflowing due to a flood. About 5,000 Lombards were captured, and the wounded and killed numbered several thousand. The Milanese alone lost 2,500 soldiers
Of the battlefield, Pietro della Vigna recorded:.

Aftermath
The Lombard League's army was virtually annihilated. Frederick made a triumphal entrance in the allied city of Cremona, with the Carroccio towed by an elephant and Tiepolo chained on it. The latter was first detained in Apulia and then publicly executed in Trani. The Carroccio was later sent to Rome as a show of the imperial power.

The Lombard League disbanded. Lodi, Novara, Vercelli, Chieri, and Savona were captured or submitted to the emperor, while Amadeus IV of Savoy and Boniface II of Montferrat confirmed their Ghibelline allegiance. Milan, Brescia, Piacenza, and Bologna remained alone in arms. Frederick, now at the top of his strength, besieged Milan. He rejected all Milanese peace overtures, insisting on unconditional surrender. Milan and five other cities, however, held out, and, in October 1238, he had to raise the siege of Brescia.

The emperor then went on to invade the Papal States, and was excommunicated by Pope Gregory IX.

References

Sources

1237 in Europe
1230s in the Holy Roman Empire
13th century in Italy
Cortenuova 1237
Wars of the Guelphs and Ghibellines
Conflicts in 1237
Battles in Lombardy
Frederick II, Holy Roman Emperor